Cycling in Berlin is a significant form of transport in the German capital where around 500,000 daily bike riders accounted for 13% of total traffic in 2010. The city has a highly developed bicycling infrastructure and it is estimated that Berlin has 710 bicycles per 1000 residents.  Among cities with more than one million inhabitants Berlin is a metropolis with one of the highest rates of bicycle commuting in the world.

Bicycle network 

In addition to a variety of bike paths and bike lanes there are also  where bikes have priority and vehicles are limited to 30kmh.

It is a circular route, completed in 2006, and traces the former German Democratic Republic border fortifications that surrounded West Berlin.

Long-distance routes 

There are a number of regional and long-distance bike paths that run through Berlin. These include the Berlin-Copenhagen trail, Berlin-Usedom Cycle Route and the European Cycle Route R1.

Bicycles on public transport 
Riders are allowed to carry their bicycles on Berlin's S-Bahn and U-Bahn trains, on trams, and on night buses if a bike ticket is purchased.

Bicycle hire system 

Berlin's bicycle hire system, Call a Bike, is run by the Deutsche Bahn.

BikeSurfBerlin is a bicycle sharing project, where you can borrow bikes for free, or on donation basis.

Velotaxi
In the 1997, Berlin-made cycle rickshaws called velotaxis were created. The tickets are about one half the cost of regular taxis. Velotaxis are three-wheeled vehicles with a "space-age lightweight plastic cab that is open on both sides", a space for a driver, and behind the driver, space for two passengers. They have been invented by Ludger Matuszewski, the founder of "Velotaxi GmbH" company.

Donkey Republic

Donkey Republic is a global bike-sharing platform present in 50 cities around Europe, with the second biggest bike fleet in Berlin. The Donkey Republic app (iOS & Android) allows citizens to find and unlock an available bike nearby. Donkey Republic aims to turn the bicycle into the hero of urban mobility and make cycling a catalyst for more livable cities, happier people and a healthier environment.

Velodrom
The Velodrom (Berlin) is an indoor track cycling arena. Holding up to 12,000 people, it was also Berlin's largest concert venue, until the opening of O2 World in 2008.

It is part of a larger complex, which includes a swimming pool as well, built in the course of the application of Berlin, for the 2000 Summer Olympics.

See also 
Bicycle
Bicycle culture
Cycling infrastructure

References

External links 
Bicycle Routes and Facilities, (Senate of Berlin)

Berlin
Cycling in Germany
Transport in Berlin